The shortlists for the 2018 CONCACAF Awards were announced on 11 December 2018.

The awards are for performances between 1 January and 10 December 2018. The results were announced on 15 January 2019.

Women's football awards

Player of the Year

Women's Football Coach of the Year

Referee of the Year

Goalkeeper of the Year

Best XI

Men's football awards

Player of the Year

Men's Football Coach of the Year

Referee of the Year

Goalkeeper of the Year

Best XI

Mixed-sex

Goal of the Year

Outstanding Performance Award

References

CONCACAF trophies and awards
Awards
CONCACAF